Kureküla is a small borough in Elva Parish, Tartu County, Estonia.

See also
Kureküla Airfield

References

External links
Rannu Parish 

Boroughs and small boroughs in Estonia